Mammoliti is an Italian surname. Notable people with the surname include:

Giorgio Mammoliti (born 1961), Canadian politician
Saverio Mammoliti (born 1942), 'Ndrangheta boss of the Mammoliti 'ndrina

Italian-language surnames